Huang Jingfeng (born 1 January 2000) is a Chinese footballer currently playing as a midfielder for Wenzhou Ouyan.

Club career
In 2021 Huang Jingfeng would be promoted to the senior team of Zhejiang and would make his debut on 20 May 2021 in a league game against Zibo Cuju in a 2-1 victory. He would be a squad player as the club gained promotion to the top tier at the end of the 2021 campaign. Huang would join lower league side Wenzhou Ouyan on 9 August 2022.

Career statistics
.

References

External links
Jingfeng Huang at Worldfootball.net

2000 births
Living people
Chinese footballers
Association football midfielders
China League One players
Zhejiang Professional F.C. players